Kinney Branch is a stream in Iron County in the U.S. state of Missouri.

Kinney Branch has the name of the local Kinney family.

See also
List of rivers of Missouri

References

Rivers of Iron County, Missouri
Rivers of Missouri